Sharon Salzberg (born August 5, 1952) is a New York Times bestselling author and teacher of Buddhist meditation practices in the West. In 1974, she co-founded the Insight Meditation Society at Barre, Massachusetts, with Jack Kornfield and Joseph Goldstein. Her emphasis is on vipassanā (insight) and mettā (loving-kindness) methods, and has been leading meditation retreats around the world for over three decades. All of these methods have their origins in the Theravada Buddhist tradition. Her books include Lovingkindness: The Revolutionary Art of Happiness (1995), A Heart as Wide as the World (1999), Real Happiness - The Power of Meditation: A 28-Day Program (2010), which was on The New York Times Best Seller list in 2011, and the follow-up Real Happiness at Work (2013). She runs a Metta Hour podcast, and contributes monthly to a column On Being.

Early life

Born in New York City to a Jewish family, Salzberg had a troubled early life after her parents divorced when she was four and her father abandoned the family. At nine, her mother died and she went to live with her father's parents. Though her father returned when she was eleven, he soon overdosed and was subsequently hospitalized.  He was placed in the mental health system, where he remained until his death. By 16, Salzberg had lived with five different families.

In her sophomore year at the State University of New York, Buffalo in 1969, Salzberg encountered Buddhism during a course in Asian philosophy. The following year, she took an independent study trip to India, and in January 1971 attended her first intensive meditation course at Bodh Gaya. In the next several years, she engaged in intensive study with various Buddhist teachers including S.N. Goenka. After returning to US in 1974, she began teaching vipassana (insight) meditation.

Salzberg had a health emergency in February 2019 of which details were not disclosed.

Career
Salzberg is a student of Dipa Ma, Anagarika Munindra, Sayadaw U Pandita and other Asian masters. She, Jack Kornfield and Joseph Goldstein founded the Insight Meditation Society at Barre, Massachusetts, in 1974. She and Goldstein co-founded the Barre Center for Buddhist Studies in 1989 and The Forest Refuge, a long-term meditation retreat center 9 years later. Today, she is a notable teacher of the Vipassana movement.

An in-depth interview with Salzberg appears in the book Meetings with Remarkable Women: Buddhist Teachers in America, by Lenore Friedman. (Boston:Shambhala, Revised and Updated edition, 2000.  )

Honors

Salzberg was honored by the New York Open Center in 1999 for her "Outstanding Contribution to the Mindfulness of the West"

Appointments 
Mind and Life Institute 2005 Investigating the Mind Conference, Panelist.
Oprah Winfrey’s O Magazine, Contributing Editor.
On Being with Krista Tippett, Weekly Columnist.

Books 
Lovingkindness: The Revolutionary Art of Happiness (1995) 
Heart as Wide as the World (1999) 
Voices of Insight (2001) 
Faith: Trusting Your Own Deepest Experience (2003) 
The Force of Kindness: Change Your Life with Love and Compassion (2006) 
The Kindness Handbook: A Practical Campanion (2008) 
Real Happiness - The Power of Meditation: A 28-Day Program (2010) 
 Real Happiness at Work: Meditations for Accomplishment, Achievement, and Peace (2013) 
 Love Your Enemies: How to Break the Anger Habit & Be a Whole Lot Happier, with Robert Thurman (2014) 
 Real Love: The Art of Mindful Connection (2017) ISBN 978-1250076502

Audio publications 
Insight Meditation: A Step-By-Step Course on How to Meditate (2002), with Joseph Goldstein .
Lovingkindness Meditation (2005) 
Guided Meditations For Love & Wisdom: 14 Essential Practices (2009) 
Unplug: An Interactive Kit for Giving Yourself a Break (2009)

Articles 
 A Teaching in Shambhala Sun Magazine
 Life of One Piece, PBS The Buddha
 How Silence Can Help Us Unplug, HuffingtonPost.com
 How Doing Nothing Can Help You Truly Live, HuffingtonPost.com
 Meditation Practice: A Paradigm Shift, HuffingtonPost.com
 12 Tips on Exploring Spirituality, Blogher.com
 The Benefits of Meditation, AARP.org
 Opening the Heart with Lovingkindness, HuffingtonPost.com
 Buddha Nature, RebelBuddha.com
 What's Better for Creativity: Depression or Happiness? HuffingtonPost.com

Interviews 
Under the Skin with Russell Brand: Will Spirituality Solve Our Global Problems?
Interview with Sharon Salzberg on CBS Religion & Culture.
Audio Interview Series on Buddhist Geeks
Salzberg interview with Dan Harris for ABC News
Huffington Post Interview with Elisha Goldstein, Ph.D.
Yoga and Buddhism's adaptation in the West: An interview with Ascent magazine.
Salzberg discusses meditation, happiness & social media with Danny Fisher for Shambhala Sun
PBS Religion & Ethics Newsweekly Interview, 2/18/2011
LA Times Interview 2/19/2011
Healthy Radio Interview 2/23/2011

References

External links 
 
 
Sharon Salzberg audio from the DIY Dharma site

American Theravada Buddhists
1952 births
Living people
20th-century American Jews
Writers from New York City
University at Buffalo alumni
 American Buddhists
Theravada Buddhism writers
Female Buddhist spiritual teachers
Theravada Buddhist spiritual teachers
Converts to Buddhism
American spoken word artists
Students of S. N. Goenka
Students of Dipa Ma
American women non-fiction writers
20th-century American women writers
21st-century American women writers
20th-century American women educators
20th-century American educators
21st-century American women educators
21st-century American educators